Denny or Dennie is a given name or nickname, primarily masculine and often a short form (hypocorism) of Dennis or Denzel which may refer to:

People with the name 
Denny Altes (born 1948), American politician
Denny Antwi (born 1993), Ghanaian footballer
Denny Ashburnham (c.1628–1697), English landowner and politician
Denny Bautista (born 1980), Dominican baseball player
Denny Bixler (1940–1981), American politician
Denny Brown (born 1956), American professional wrestler
Denny Bruce (born 1944), American record producer and music manager
Denny Cagur, (born 1977), Indonesian comedian and TV host
Denny Cardin (born 1988), Italian footballer
Denny Carmassi (born 1947), American drummer
Denny Chin (born 1954), American federal judge
Denny Chronopoulos (1968–2000), Canadian football player
Denny Coffman, American politician
Denny Cordell (1943–1995), English record producer
Denny Crum (born 1937), former American college men's basketball coach
Denny Doherty (1940–2007), Canadian musician; former member of the folk group The Mamas & the Papas
Dennis Douds (born 1941), American football coach
Denham Fouts (1914–1948), American male prostitute and socialite
Dennie Gordon (born 1953), American film and television director
Denny Hamlin (born 1980), American NASCAR auto racer
Dennis Hastert (born 1942), American politician and former Speaker of the United States House of Representatives
Denny Hocking (born 1970), American former professional baseball player
Denny Hulme (1938–1992), New Zealand Formula One auto racer
Denny Kantono (born 1970), Indonesian retired badminton player
Denny Laine (born 1944), English rock musician
Denny Landzaat (born 1976), Dutch footballer
Denny Matthews (born 1942), American sportscaster
Denny McLain (born 1944), American baseball player
Denny Morrison (born 1985), Canadian world and Olympic champion speedskater
Denny Moyer (1939–2010), American boxer; world light middleweight champion (1962–63)
Denny Neagle (born 1968), American baseball player
Dennis O'Neil (born 1939), American comic book writer and editor
Dennie Oxley (born 1970), American politician
Denny R. (born 1994), Filipino author under the pen name HaveYouSeenThisGirL
Denny Rehberg (born 1955), U.S. Representative for Montana's At-large congressional district
Denny Seiwell (born 1943), American rock musician
Denny Shute (1904–1974), American golfer
Denny Solomona (born 1993), New Zealand rugby league player
Denny Smith (born 1938), businessman and former congressman from Oregon

Fictional characters 
Denny Crane, in the American TV series Boston Legal
Denny Duquette, in the American TV series Grey's Anatomy
Dennis “Denny” Rickman Jr, in the British soap opera EastEnders
Denny, in the film The Room

Others 
Denny (hybrid hominin), name given to a fossil of an archaic human

Masculine given names
Hypocorisms